Andrew Cohen (born August 9, 1969) is a Justice of the Bronx branch of the New York Supreme Court. He is a Democrat. He was previously the councilmember for the 11th district of the New York City Council, resigning in 2020, with Eric Dinowitz winning the special election to succeed him. The district includes Bedford Park, Kingsbridge, Norwood, Riverdale, Van Cortlandt Village, Wakefield, and Woodlawn Heights in The Bronx.

Life and career
Cohen was born on August 9, 1969, in Brooklyn. He earned a B.A. in sociology from SUNY New Paltz and a J.D. from the Cardozo School of Law, and is an attorney.

Prior to joining the New York City Council, Cohen served as a member of Bronx Community Board 8 and legal advisor to Assemblyman Jeffrey Dinowitz. He was also an adjunct professor at the CUNY John Jay College of Criminal Justice and a court attorney to a justice of the Bronx Supreme Court.

New York City Council
Councilman G. Oliver Koppell was term-limited in 2013 and unable to run for another term, and as a result, Cohen entered the race to succeed him.  After winning the primary, he was elected to a full term in November 2013. Cohen ran for Supreme Court Justice in the Bronx in November 2020, and resigned from the New York City Council, ending his term on December 31, 2020.

Election history

References

External links
Official website

Living people
New York (state) Democrats
John Jay College of Criminal Justice faculty
Place of birth missing (living people)
New York City Council members
1969 births
Benjamin N. Cardozo School of Law alumni
State University of New York at New Paltz alumni
21st-century American politicians
Politicians from the Bronx